Henry and June may refer to:

 Henry and June, a 1986 novel by Anais Nin
 Henry & June, the 1990 film based upon the above novel
 Henry and June, characters from the 1996 cartoon KaBlam!